ALSO Holding AG is a listed distribution and logistics company based in Emmen, Switzerland.

Background
ALSO is one of the leading technology providers for the ICT industry currently active in 28 countries in Europe and in a total of 143 countries worldwide via PaaS partners. In 2021, net sales of the Swiss-based company, which employs around 4000 people, amounted to 12.4 billion euros.  

The ALSO ecosystem offers around 120 000 resellers hardware, software and IT services from more than 700 vendors in over 1450 product categories. In the spirit of the circular economy, the company provides all services from provision to refurbishment from a single source. ALSO has three business models: The Supply division comprises the transactional range of hardware and software. The Solutions division supports customers in the development of customized IT solutions. Subscription-based cloud offerings as well as platforms for cybersecurity, virtualization and AI are the focus of the Service area. 

ALSO was founded in 1984 and has been listed on the Swiss stock exchange since 1986. In 1988, ALSO became majority-owned by Schindler Holding AG. On February 9, 2011, Actebis of Germany and the ALSO Holding of Switzerland merged their activities and renaming the company ALSO-Actebis Holding with its headquarters in Switzerland. On March 14, 2013, the name was changed back to ALSO Holding AG.

In 2016, their largest subsidiary - representing 44% of sales - ALSO Deutschland GmbH, is located in Soest, Germany. Once the largest IT distributor in Germany, ALSO Deutschland is now second to Ingram Micro after Ingram's 2013 purchase of Brightpoint Inc.

In October 2019, ALSO Holding completed the acquisition of IT Solutions distributor Solytron Bulgaria. 

In November 2019, ALSO signed distribution agreements with the companies Delfin, Girbau and Hovmand, extending its range of offerings for the HP Multi Jet Fusion industrial 3D printer that has been part of the portfolio since 2017.

Shareholding structure
The majority of shares are privately held:
51 %	Special Distribution Holding GmbH, Düsseldorf (Germany)
49 %	Freefloat

References

Logistics companies of Switzerland
Companies listed on the SIX Swiss Exchange